Mahmood Mosque is an Ahmadi Muslim mosque in Regina, the capital of the Canadian province of Saskatchewan. It is  Saskatchewans first purpose-built mosque.

References

2016 establishments in Saskatchewan
Ahmadiyya mosques in Canada
Religious buildings and structures in Saskatchewan
Buildings and structures in Regina, Saskatchewan
Mosques completed in 2016
21st-century religious buildings and structures in Canada